Gamal El-Din El-Koumy (born 28 August 1958) is an Egyptian boxer. He competed at the 1984 Summer Olympics and the 1988 Summer Olympics.

References

1958 births
Living people
Egyptian male boxers
Olympic boxers of Egypt
Boxers at the 1984 Summer Olympics
Boxers at the 1988 Summer Olympics
Place of birth missing (living people)
Mediterranean Games medalists in boxing
Bantamweight boxers
Mediterranean Games gold medalists for Egypt
Competitors at the 1983 Mediterranean Games
20th-century Egyptian people